Supreme Assembly may refer to:

 Supreme Assembly (Nakhchivan)
 Supreme Assembly (Tajikistan)
 Supreme Assembly (Uzbekistan)

See also 
 Supreme Council (disambiguation)